Kemili (also Romanized as Kemīlī; also known as Kemmelī) is a village in Dadenjan Rural District, Meymand District, Firuzabad County, Fars Province, Iran. At the 2006 census, its population was 84, in 22 families.

References 

Populated places in Firuzabad County